Deandra "Sweet Dee"/"Dee" Reynolds is a fictional character on the FX television series It's Always Sunny in Philadelphia (2005–present), created by Rob McElhenney, Glenn Howerton, Charlie Day, and Jordan Reid, and portrayed by Kaitlin Olson. Dee was the only major character in the show to be conceived without an actor in mind. She was originally portrayed by Reid (McElhenney's girlfriend at the time) in the unaired pilot. Although she was originally written to be a voice of reason, Dee's character quickly became an equal participant in The Gang's illicit and morally questionable activities once Olson was cast.

Character biography
Dee is Dennis Reynolds' twin sister and is the main bartender at their bar, Paddy's Pub. Dee was unpopular in high school due to her severe scoliosis, for which she wore a corrective back brace that earned her the nickname "The Aluminium Monster". Additionally, she is often ridiculed for her resemblance to a bird by the rest of The Gang, especially Dennis and Mac. She claims to be tolerant and compassionate; in reality, however, she is selfish, greedy, emotionally insensitive, hypocritical, and prejudiced. In "The Gang Gets Invincible", Dee poses as male alter ego "Cole" to try out for the Philadelphia Eagles with Mac and Dennis; she does a superb job and impresses the Eagles coaches until she stuns everyone by revealing she is a woman right before her punting tryout, after which she kicks the ball and severely injures her foot. Her father Frank is the only one who considers Dee a true member of The Gang. Whenever there is a decision or a vote among members of The Gang, the three other guys habitually exclude her. In the 6th episode of the 3rd season ("The Gang Solves the North Korea Situation") it is revealed that Dee's breath "smells like vomit" despite maintaining a hygienic outward appearance.

Though Dee was originally intended to be a sensible and compassionate counterpoint to the other characters, she has shown herself to be just as morally corrupt as the rest of the gang. She consistently uses others for her own ends, including: feigning affection for Matthew "Rickety Cricket" Mara for financial gain only to reject him when he leaves the priesthood for her; blackmailing the Waitress to come out with her for drinks despite the fact the woman is a recovering alcoholic; and pushing a reluctant young girl into performing with her in a beauty pageant.

Dee is usually ignored or ridiculed whenever she presents an idea to The Gang; however, if someone repeats her exact suggestion, it is immediately accepted. In her will, Dee's mother tells her that she has been a disappointment and a mistake. Consequently, she has considerable animosity towards her mother, and many of her actions are designed to "shove it in her face".

In "Dennis and Dee Go on Welfare", she and Dennis temporarily develop an addiction to crack cocaine, which is brought up a few times in later episodes.

In "Dennis and Dee's Mom Is Dead", her cruel mother Barbara dies in a botched neck lift and leaves her and Frank, Barbara's ex-husband, nothing to inherit. In an attempt to inherit Barbara's money, which was given to Dee's biological father Bruce Mathis, Dee and Frank stage a fake wedding. The scheme backfires however.

A recurring joke on the show is Dee having her car destroyed or stolen. In season 4, Mac and Charlie steal and crash her blue Dodge Neon to fake their deaths ("Mac and Charlie Die"). In season 5, her next car, a red Ford Aspire, is stolen the same day she bought it by a hitchhiker the gang picked up on their way to the Grand Canyon ("The Gang Hits The Road"). After Dee becomes his mistress in "Dennis Gets Divorced", Bill Ponderosa gives her a brand new black BMW 3 Series. Soon after, however, another of Bill's mistresses arrives to reclaim the car as Bill had originally given it to her. In "The Maureen Ponderosa Wedding Massacre", Charlie and Mac steal Dee's purple Chrysler PT Cruiser and crash it into a pole, totaling it, claiming "zombies must have stolen [it]." However, the same PT Cruiser shows up again in the next episode, "Charlie and Dee Find Love," with Charlie complaining, "I can't believe you just bought another ridiculous ugly car" just before another car crashes into it.

Pregnancy
In one of the show's most well-known story arcs, Dee gets pregnant, but does not reveal the identity of the father. The father is eventually revealed to be a transgender woman named Carmen who once dated Mac. Dee carries Carmen's child as a surrogate, having been impregnated through Carmen's sperm and an egg from a donor. She gives birth to a girl in the episode "Dee Gives Birth". The episode was dedicated to Axel Lee McElhenney (Kaitlin Olson's and Rob McElhenney's real-life son).

Dee's cynical and narcissistic personality may be due to a head injury. In "The Gang Buys a Roller Rink" (Season 15 Episode 3) which mainly takes place in the 1990s, Dee is originally portrayed as sweet, kind, and outgoing. However, when she suffers a head injury from a roller skating fall, her personality abruptly switches to the cold and callous characteristics that Dee has in the present day.

Career
After flunking out of the University of Pennsylvania, where she had intended to major in psychology, Dee decided to become an actress. However, she has put little effort into realizing her ambition and has never had any significant acting work; as a result, The Gang frequently says that she has no talent for anything.

Dee's aspirations to be an actress inspire her to create several characters, all of which are based on ethnic stereotypes. Many of these are seen in the episode "America's Next Top Paddy's Billboard Model Contest", in which she attempts to be discovered by talent agencies by posting videos of her acting on YouTube. However, her presence in the videos is overshadowed by Charlie's performances as Green Man. Although Dee shows no on-camera stage fright, she consistently faces severe glossophobia when performing in front of an audience. When she performs a stand-up comedy routine at a local comedy club, she repeatedly gags and dry-heaves on stage due to her anxiety. Her only legitimate acting job was a small part in an adult film seen in the episode "Dee Makes a Smut Film".

Relationships
Since high school and through the entire series, Dee has had a long list of failed relationships and one-night stands that includes: a high-school boy who uses her for alcohol and to make his girlfriend jealous; a thief who robs the bar; a middle-aged toothless Korean busboy; a sweet, but simple-minded Iraq War veteran named Ben, who ultimately finds her to be "a mean person"; Lil Kev, a rapper who The Gang thought was mentally retarded (though the episode ends with Dee thinking he is neurotypical because Dennis claims he lied to her about his mental retardation); and Bill Ponderosa, a man whom she had a crush on back in high school only to find out he was an overweight loser and married. Like the other members of The Gang, Dee drinks heavily, often hoping to calm herself when meeting an attractive man. She harbors a phobia of the elderly. Despite her many insecurities, Dee is aggressively outspoken and is prone to violence when angered. At one point, she assaults a homeless person she finds masturbating in the alley behind Paddy's. Charlie and Dee accidentally use steroids in "Hundred Dollar Baby", which greatly increases their anger. In "The Gang Solves the North Korea Situation", she is, along with Frank and Mac, on an American Idol-like panel where she portrays a drunken spoof of Paula Abdul, slurring her words and judging hopefuls in a talent contest. She drinks heavily from a cup full of "rum and Coke" and uses the event as an excuse to criticize and demean the contestants.

Family

References

Fictional actors
Fictional alcohol abusers
Fictional bartenders
Fictional blackmailers
Fictional cannabis users
Fictional characters from Philadelphia
Television characters introduced in 2005
Fictional cocaine users
Fictional Democrats (United States)
Fictional rapists
Fictional schoolteachers
Fictional twins
It's Always Sunny in Philadelphia characters